The 2007 Missouri Tigers football team represented the University of Missouri in the 2007 NCAA Division I FBS football season. The team was coached by Gary Pinkel and played their home games at Faurot Field at Memorial Stadium.

The team was led by junior quarterback Chase Daniel, a Heisman Trophy candidate who finished fourth in voting behind Tim Tebow, Darren McFadden, and Colt Brennan. In the preseason, the Tigers were picked by some to win the Big 12 North.

On November 24, Missouri won their 11th game of the season by beating their arch-rival Kansas Jayhawks 36–28, in the Border Showdown at Arrowhead Stadium in Kansas City, Missouri. The victory sealed Mizzou's berth into the 2007 Big 12 Championship Game against Oklahoma.

The Tigers won over 9 games in a season for the first time since 1969, and were ranked No. 1 in the AP Poll for the first time since 1960.   This ranking lead to the Tigers' first ever appearance on the cover of Sports Illustrated magazine.  The Tigers also achieved their highest BCS ranking in history, at No. 1 after the Border Showdown.

After losing the Big 12 Championship game 38–17 to the Sooners, Missouri was chosen to play Arkansas in the Cotton Bowl Classic in Dallas, in which the Tigers prevailed 38–7 to complete their 12–2 season.

Five Tiger starters were named to the Associated Press All-American teams. Senior tight end Martin Rucker and freshman wide receiver Jeremy Maclin (as an all-purpose player) were named as first team selections, while junior quarterback Chase Daniel and junior safety William Moore were named to the second team. Senior center Adam Spieker was a third team selection.

Schedule

Game summaries

vs. Illinois Fighting Illini (Arch Rivalry Game in St. Louis, Missouri)

at Ole Miss Rebels

vs. Western Michigan Broncos

vs. Illinois State Redbirds

vs. Nebraska Cornhuskers

at Oklahoma Sooners

vs. Texas Tech Red Raiders

vs. Iowa State Cyclones

at Colorado Buffaloes

vs. Texas A&M

at Kansas State Wildcats

vs. Kansas Jayhawks (Border Showdown in Kansas City, Missouri)

vs. Oklahoma Sooners (Big 12 Championship in San Antonio, Texas)

vs. Arkansas (72nd Cotton Bowl Classic in Dallas, Texas)

Roster

Coaching staff

Coaching staff from:

Rankings

Statistics
(through Cotton Bowl Classic, Jan. 1, 2008)

Scores by Quarter

Offense

Field Goals / PAT

Special teams

Defense

Statistics from:

References

Missouri
Missouri Tigers football seasons
Cotton Bowl Classic champion seasons
Missouri Tigers football